The flag of the Navajo Nation is the official flag of the Navajo Nation, a Native American governed nation in the Four Corners states of Arizona, New Mexico, and Utah.

History

On 21 May 1968, the flag was adopted for the Navajo Nation, a reservation in the Southwestern United States. This flag was designed by Jay R. Degroat, a student from Mariano Lake, New Mexico and was initially selected from 140 entries for the Navajo Flag Competition.
It incorporates elements of the tribal seal designed by Amos Frank Singer and John Claw, Jr. adopted earlier, on 18 January 1952.

Description

On a pale buff, tan, or copper field (sources differ), four sacred mountains of four different colors (black, white, turquoise, and yellow from the Navajo creation story) surround the center element of the flag, a map of the Navajo Nation with a white disk in the center that features elements from the Navajo tribal seal. The overall flag recalls sand painting, an art form used by the Navajos.

A rainbow symbolizing Navajo sovereignty appears over the main design.

In 1995, the Navajo flag became the first Native American tribal flag in space when Bernard Harris carried it aboard the space shuttle Discovery.

See also
 Navajo white
 Vexillology

References

Navajo Nation
Navajo Nation
Navajo Nation
Flags displaying animals